The Haval H6 is a compact crossover SUV produced by the Chinese manufacturer Great Wall Motor under the Haval marque since 2011. It was introduced at the 2011 Shanghai Auto Show, and it is a crossover, produced with both front-wheel-drive and four-wheel-drive drivetrain. It is the successor of the Great Wall Pegasus.

Originally named Great Wall Haval H6, it was later renamed the Haval H6 (and redesigned) for the newly developed the Haval brand. As of October 2015, the Haval H6 is the best selling SUV in China. It has been the best selling SUV every month in China for nearly two years.

First generation (2011)

Features

The first generation H6 is powered by a 1.5-litre turbo engine producing  or a 1.3-litre turbo engine producing . In the top trim level it can be equipped with high-strength body structure, front, side and curtain airbags, brake assist system, tyre-pressure monitoring system, parking sensors and reversing camera, keyless entry, light and rain sensors, Bluetooth hands free system and a 7-inch touch screen display with DVD multimedia system. It can also be equipped with a 10-way adjustable driver's seat, heated front seats, leather seats, climate control with rear seats air vents, automatic headlights, power sunroof, cruise control and 17-inch aluminum wheels.

It is powered by a range of turbocharged petrol or common rail diesel engines, which are able to meet the Euro V emission standards and can be equipped with Start & Stop system. It has four disk brakes with ABS and EBD, electronic stability control (ESC), MacPherson strut independent front suspension and independent rear suspension with double cross arm and torsion bar springs, and intelligent four-wheel-drive system.

It uses components originating from renowned European and American manufacturers, such as Bosch (traction control), Delphi (diesel electronics), BorgWarner (four-wheel-drive system), and Honeywell (turbocharger).

Production
The Haval H6 is produced at the new production base of Great Wall Motors, located in Tianjin, China, which inaugurated its mass production in February 2011. It is also assembled (from knock-down kits) at the Litex Motors factory in Bahovitsa, Bulgaria, from where it is exported to other markets in the European Union.

In November 2015, the one millionth Haval H6 rolled off the production lines in the Tianjin plant, approximately four years and three months after its launch.

Safety

In March 2022, the Haval H6 was awarded a five star rating by the Australian safety rating program (ANCAP).

Reception
In a review made by the Italian magazine Al Volante, the Haval H6 was appreciated for the comfortable and spacious interior, the rich endowment with features and its low price against the European, Korean and Japanese rivals. It was criticized for its relatively sluggish gearbox, the lack of power from the diesel engine at low revs, the rear window visibility and the rigid plastic used in the dashboard.

Gallery

Second generation (2017)

The second generation Haval H6 was based on the same platform as its predecessor, the first generation Haval H6. However, the first generation Haval H6 low-end versions will continue as a budget model positioned below the second generation. The second generation Haval H6 also shares the same underpinnings of the WEY VV5.

Variants
The second generation Haval H6 was available as two variants at launch with different designs for different target market groups, distinguished via the color of the Haval badge. The Haval H6 Blue Label model features a blue Haval badge while the Red Label model has a red Haval badge. The H6 Red Label and Blue Label differ mostly at the front and rear. The front ends are fitted with different grilles, bumpers, and lights. The rear features different tailgate design, bumper design with different mud guards and different pipes. The duo-label strategy was dropped later in 2020 with the logo replaced with a Black label while styling-wise the variant that continued to be available was the previous Red Label model.

Powertrain
The engine in the second generation Haval H6 is the same engine as the one powering the WEY 02, which is a 2.0-litre turbo engine producing .

Haval H6 China-Chic Edition
As of March 2021, a special edition of the Haval H6 was launched called the China-Chic Edition (国潮版). The China-Chic Edition Haval H6 is based on the second generation Haval H6 while featuring a redesigned front fascia, rear end and window graphics.

Third generation (2020)

The third generation Haval H6 has debuted at the Chengdu Motor Show 2020. Haval officially opened pre-sales of the third generation H6 in July 2020. The pre-sale price range from RMB 122,000 to RMB 141,000 (~US$17,385 - US$20,092).

The third generation H6 is Haval's first model built on the Lemon platform. The new-gen Haval H6 is powered by a 1.5-litre turbo engine or a 2.0-litre turbo engine. The gearbox of the third generation H6 is a fresh 9-speed dual-clutch transmission.
For the third generation model, the H6 was given new exterior and interior.

The Haval H6 for the Brunei market is went on sale in August 2021. Imported from China, it is offered in Pro (2WD), Max (2WD), Supreme (4WD) and Ultra (4WD) variants with the 2.0-litre GW4C20NT inline-4 petrol engine with 7-speed dual-clutch transmission as the single powertrain option.

The Haval H6 was launched by Sazgar Engineering Works in 2021. Initially it was imported as a CBU form but the model will be assembled in Pakistan on 1st September 2022. It is offered in two variants are, 1.5L Turbo FWD and 2.0L Turbo AWD.

Haval H6 Supreme+ Edition

A variant of the third generation H6 was launched during the 2021 Shanghai Auto Show called the Haval H6 5G Edition. The H6 5G Edition is equipped with 5G internet provided by China Mobile, and features a restyled front end. Additionally, facial recognition and FOTA would also be featured.

The model was later launched as the H6 Supreme+ edition during the 2021 Chengdu Auto Show as a 10 year anniversary special edition model. The model is equipped with the same powertrain options as the base H6 model and features a restyled front fascia design.

Haval H6 Vance Edition 
A special edition (optional of the car bodykits) of the H6 called the H6 Vance was offered in Brunei in June 2022.

The Brunei-market Haval H6 Vance comes with custom front and rear bumper, skirts, rear spoiler, carbon cover for side mirrors, front chrome and rear chrome strip. Additionally, customers in the country can opt for black rims, calipers colours and black pack for cosmetic changes.

Haval H6S
A fastback variant of the third generation H6 was unveiled in August 2021 called the Haval H6S.  

There are two engine options for the H6S in China, one of which is the 2.0-litre turbo four-cylinder engine, and the other is a hybrid powertrain that pairs a 1.5-litre turbo-petrol engine with a two-speed electric motor and a small 1.8 kWh battery pack that stores recycled braking energy.
The lower front bumper was criticized for resembling those of the NIO ES6 and EC6.

Outside China, the H6 GT will be going on sale in Australia in July 2022, South Africa in September 2022, and in Brunei on 15 February 2023.

Haval H6 HEV 
The hybrid variant of the H6 debuted at the 2021 Bangkok international Motor Show in March 2021 and went on sale in Thailand on 5 July 2021.

Haval H6 PHEV 
A plug-in hybrid variant of the third generation H6 debuted at the 2021 Motor Expo in Thailand in December 2021. It features a restyled front end.

References

External links

Official website
Model description

H6
Compact sport utility vehicles
Crossover sport utility vehicles
Front-wheel-drive vehicles
All-wheel-drive vehicles
ANCAP small off-road
C-NCAP small off-road
Plug-in hybrid vehicles
Hybrid vehicles
Cars of China
2010s cars